Arthur Willard Pryor (September 22, 1869 – June 18, 1942) was a trombone virtuoso, bandleader, and soloist with the Sousa Band. He was a prolific composer of band music, his best-known composition being "The Whistler and His Dog". In later life, he became a Democratic Party politician from New Jersey, who served on the Monmouth County Board of Chosen Freeholders during the 1930s.

Early life and education
He was born on September 22, 1869 on the second floor of the Lyceum Theater in Saint Joseph, Missouri. He was the son of Samuel Pryor, bandmaster and founder of the original Pryor band, and his wife. Arthur first took up music at a very young age under the tutelage of his father and was playing the valve trombone by age 11. The story goes that whenever he hit a sour note while practicing, his father planted a resounding crack on his head with a violin bow. The boy developed until he was so skilled that he won a place in the John Philip Sousa's band. He was hailed as a prodigy after this.

Musical career

Pryor went on to direct the Stanley Opera Company in Denver, Colorado until joining the John Philip Sousa Band in 1892. He played his first solo with the Sousa Band at age 22 during the 1893 World's Columbian Exposition in Chicago. During his 12 years with the Sousa Band, Pryor estimated that he played 10,000 solos. From 1895 to 1903, Pryor was assistant conductor of the Sousa Band. During his association with the "March King", Pryor toured throughout the USA and Europe. While in Europe, he entertained King Edward VII of England and Czar Nicholas II of Russia with his trombone solos. Once while in Germany, all the trombonists of the German Army bands were ordered to hear him play. They were so amazed at his playing that they insisted on taking his trombone apart, refusing to believe that it was natural. Finally one German said: "No one can play so well. It is a Yankee trick."

In 1902 after the death of his father, Pryor ended his association with Sousa and took over the reorganized Pryor band; he led its debut at the Majestic Theatre in New York City on November 15, 1903. For 30 years thereafter, Pryor's band was an American institution. He made his first appearance in Asbury Park, New Jersey at the Shore in 1904, where he continued to play until 1930. The Pryor Band toured until 1909, when he decided to settle down and make Asbury Park the home of the band. Also at this time, he became a staff conductor and arranger for the Victor Talking Machine Company in Camden, New Jersey. He organized a second band that played at the entertainment complex of Coney Island, New York, for a number of years.

Post-conducting career and death
Pryor retired from full-time conducting in 1933. On November 7 of that year, he and Henry W. Herbert were elected to the Monmouth County Board of Chosen Freeholders, defeating Director Bryant B. Newcomb and his running mate, Arthur Johnson. Pryor and Herbert would each serve one, three-year term in office. In the 1936 election, they were defeated by Republicans J. Russell Woolley and Edgar O. Murphy.

Pryor was married to Maude Russell Pryor.  Their son Roger Pryor (1901–1974) also became a bandleader and a film actor. They also had sons Arthur Jr., who became a bandsman and advertising executive, and Samuel Pryor.

The senior Pryor suffered a stroke on June 17, 1942, and died on June 18 at his home in West Long Branch, New Jersey.  Funeral services were conducted June 21, 1942, at the Trinity Episcopal Church, Asbury Park, followed by burial in Glenwood Cemetery, West Long Branch.

Legacy

Pryor composed some 300 works, including marches, novelties, tone poems and three light operas, Jinga Boo, Uncle Tom's Cabin and On the Eve of Her Wedding Day.  Among his best-known numbers were "On Jersey Shore", "Queen Titania" and "The Whistler and His Dog". He set to work on an opera titled Peter and Paul, with a libretto by L. Frank Baum; the libretto has been lost. It was intended to star Fred Stone and David Montgomery in several roles in several time periods.

During his career, Pryor wrote some of today's most well-known trombone literature, including an arrangement of the heralded "Bluebells of Scotland", as well as band novelty works such as "The Whistler and His Dog", with its piccolo solo, his best-known composition. Much of this literature has been recorded by Ian Bousfield on his CD Pryor Engagement (Doyen DOY CD212).

In 1985, thousands of early Pryor scores were discovered by conductor Rick Benjamin. He has played many of Pryor's compositions with his Paragon Ragtime Orchestra.

Media

References

External links
 
List of Works by Arthur Willard Pryor at Geoff Grainger's Webpages
Biography of Arthur Pryor at Bill Edwards' Ragtime Site
Recordings from the 19th Century, includes a solo by Pryor recorded in 1897
 Dillon's Music On Arthur Pryor's Trombone
The Asbury Park Boardwalk, Past, Present and Future
Arthur Pryor: Ragtime Pioneer, Paragon Ragtime - explains how Arthur Pryor introduced syncopation to military marches and became a proponent of Ragtime music.
MIDI sequences of piano transcriptions of compositions by Arthur Pryor
 Arthur Pryor recordings at the Discography of American Historical Recordings.
audio recording of "Canhanibalmo Rag", Library of Congress jukebox

1869 births
1942 deaths
People from St. Joseph, Missouri
American bandleaders
American classical trombonists
Male trombonists
Victor Records artists
County commissioners in New Jersey
New Jersey Democrats
Pioneer recording artists
Ragtime composers
Burials in New Jersey
People from West Long Branch, New Jersey
Jersey Shore musicians
Classical musicians from New Jersey